Flórián Albert Jr. (born 12 December 1967) is a Hungarian former professional footballer who played as a midfielder.

Career
The son of Ballon d'Or-winning footballer Flórián Albert Sr., Albert played professional club football in Hungary, Israel, and France for Ferencváros, Maccabi Petah Tikva, Red Star and BKV Előre SC. He also earned six caps for Hungary between 1993 and 1996.

References

External links

1967 births
Living people
Association football midfielders
Hungarian footballers
Hungary international footballers
Footballers from Budapest
Ferencvárosi TC footballers
Maccabi Petah Tikva F.C. players
Red Star F.C. players
Hungarian expatriate footballers
Hungarian expatriate sportspeople in Israel
Expatriate footballers in Israel